Mortierellales  is a monotypic fungal order, within the phylum of Zygomycota and the monotypic, division of Mortierellomycota. It contains only 1 known family, Mortierellaceae , and 6 genera and around 129 species.

Genera
 Aquamortierella - 1 sp.
 Dissophora - 3 sp.
 Gamsiella - 1 sp.
 Lobosporangium - 1 sp.
 Modicella - 3 sp.
 Mortierella - 120 sp.

References

External links

 https://www.uniprot.org/taxonomy/214503

Zygomycota
Fungus orders